Moneta is a census-designated place in Bedford County, Virginia, United States. The community is located along Route 122 between the towns of Bedford and Rocky Mount.

History
Olive Branch Missionary Baptist Church and the Holland-Duncan House are listed on the National Register of Historic Places.

On August 26, 2015, the community made news when journalists Alison Parker and Adam Ward were murdered on live television by former colleague Vester Flanagan at a nearby shopping center and marina.

Geography
According to the United States Census Bureau, the CDP has a total area of 3.846 square miles (9.96 km²).

Demographics

2020 census
The community was delineated by the US Census Bureau for the first time during the 2020 Census.

As of the census of 2020, there were 450 people residing in the CDP. There were 223 housing units. The racial makeup of the CDP was 81.8% White, 6.9% African American or Black, 0.0% American Indian, 0.7% Asian, 0.0% Pacific Islander, 2.4% from other races, and 8.2% from two or more races. Hispanic or Latino of any race were 6.7% of the population.

Government
The United States Postal Service operates the Moneta Post Office within the CDP. The Moneta ZIP code extends to both sides of Smith Mountain Lake, including parts of Franklin County, since there is no Smith Mountain Lake postal address.

Law enforcement is provided by the Bedford County Sheriff's Office, which maintains a field office within the CDP. Fire protection is provided by Moneta Volunteer Fire Department, which operates three fire stations, including one within the CDP. Emergency medical services are provided by the Moneta Volunteer Rescue Squad and Bedford County Department of Fire and Rescue.

Education
The CDP is served by Bedford County Public Schools. Public school students residing in Moneta are zoned to attend Moneta Elementary School, Staunton River Middle School, and Staunton River High School.

Transportation

Air
Smith Mountain Lake Airport is the closest general aviation airport to Moneta. The Roanoke-Blacksburg Regional Airport and Lynchburg Regional Airport are the closest airports with commercial service.

Highways
 Virginia Route 122

Rail
A Norfolk Southern rail line runs through the CDP. The closest passenger rail service is located in Roanoke and Lynchburg.

In popular culture
Moneta was popularized as the filming location for scenes in the 1991 movie What About Bob?. In the movie, Bob arrived by bus with his goldfish and went into a local general store, which still stands, albeit in a disheveled state because it is no longer open.

References

Unincorporated communities in Bedford County, Virginia
Unincorporated communities in Virginia